Shirin Mohseni is an ethnic Hazara politician from Afghanistan, who  represented the people of Daykundi in the 15th and 16th terms of the Afghanistan Parliament.

Early life 
Shirin Mohseni was born in 1980 in Shahristan District of Daykundi province. She completed her schooling at "Bint Al-Huda High School" in Daykundi and received her bachelor's degree in jurisprudence and law from Khatam Al-Nabieen University in Kabul.

See also 
 List of Hazara people

References 

Living people
1980 births
Hazara politicians
People from Daykundi Province